John Bosak (September 9, 1922 – December 6, 1994) was an American professional basketball player. He played for the Youngstown Bears in the National Basketball League during the 1946–47 season and averaged 2.4 points per game.

References

1922 births
1994 deaths
United States Marine Corps personnel of World War II
American men's basketball players
Basketball players from Pennsylvania
Guards (basketball)
People from Farrell, Pennsylvania
Basketball players from Los Angeles
Youngstown Bears players